The Spectrum (French: Le Spectrum de Montréal) was a concert hall, in Montreal, Quebec, Canada, that closed on August 5, 2007. Opened on October 17, 1952, as the Alouette Theatre, it was briefly renamed Club Montreal before receiving its popular name.

The Spectrum had a capacity of about 1200 and had a "cabaret" setup with table service. A unique effect was the wall mounted lighting which included hundreds of small lightbulbs.

The last show was performed by Michel Rivard, the only performer to have played over one hundred concerts at the venue. The block on which the building stands was slated to be torn down and rebuilt as a combined shopping centre and office complex. The Spectrum had been owned by Équipe Spectra which owns other venues in Montreal.

On February 17, 2008, the borough of Ville Marie voted to proceed with demolition plans and on October 18, 2008, almost 56 years to the day from when it first opened, the Spectrum was torn down.

References

Music venues in Montreal
Former music venues in Canada
Demolished buildings and structures in Montreal
Downtown Montreal
 
Buildings and structures demolished in 2008